John Snyder Carlile (December 16, 1817October 24, 1878) was an American merchant, lawyer, slaveowner and politician, including a United States senator. A strong supporter of the Union cause during the American Civil War, he represented the loyalist faction of Virginia, which was eventually separated into two distinct states.

Biography
Carlile was born in Winchester, Virginia. He was educated by his mother until he was fourteen years old, when he became salesman in a store, and at the age of seventeen went into business on his own account. He then studied law, was admitted to the bar in 1840, and began practice in Beverly. Entering politics, he joined the Democratic Party. He was selected as a delegate to the Virginia state constitutional convention in 1850. Carlile served in the Virginia State Senate from 1847 to 1851. He joined the new Know Nothing political movement in 1854 and represented Virginia's 11th District in the United States House for one term.

Carlile was a delegate from Harrison County to the Virginia secession convention in 1861, voting no on the controversial resolution. He was a leader in the anti-secession movement, and was prominent in the Wheeling Convention of June 1861.  On June 13, 1861, at the first session of the Second Wheeling Convention, Carlile authored  "A Declaration of the People of Virginia."  The document pronounced Virginia's Ordinance of Secession illegal because the convention at which it had been drafted had been convened by the General Assembly, not by a referendum.  It also called for the reorganization of the government of Virginia, arguing that due to Virginia's decision to secede from the United States, all state government offices had been vacated.  The pro-Union Restored Government of Virginia was quickly recognized by President Abraham Lincoln and Congress as the legitimate government of the entire Commonwealth of Virginia, with Wheeling as its provisional capital.  He was averse, however, to the formation of a new state out of the bulk of the pro-Union territory of Virginia—what became West Virginia.

Carlile was again chosen to Congress in 1861 on a Unionist Party position, but kept his seat in the House of Representatives only from July 4 through July 13, when he was elected as one of two United States Senators representing the Restored Government.  He served until 1865. In the Senate, he was uniformly in favor of a strict construction of the Constitution, opposing all measures recognizing that there existed a rebellion of states instead of individuals, and denying the right of Congress to interfere in any way with the slaves (Carlile being a slaveowner himself). He frequently met with Lincoln to try to garner his support for his causes.

Following the war, Carlile retired from politics and returned home to resume his law practice. He died in Clarksburg, West Virginia, and was buried in the Odd Fellows Cemetery.

References and links

John S. Carlile in Encyclopedia Virginia
 Appleton's Cyclopedia of American Biography, edited by James Grant Wilson and John Fiske. Six volumes, New York: D. Appleton and Company, 1887–1889.

1817 births
1878 deaths
19th-century American lawyers
American slave owners
Delegates of the 1861 Wheeling Convention
Democratic Party United States senators from Virginia
Democratic Party members of the United States House of Representatives from Virginia
People from Beverly, West Virginia
Politicians from Clarksburg, West Virginia
Politicians from Winchester, Virginia
People of West Virginia in the American Civil War
Union (American Civil War) political leaders
Unionist Party United States senators
Virginia Know Nothings
Virginia lawyers
Virginia Secession Delegates of 1861
Democratic Party Virginia state senators
Virginia Unionists
West Virginia lawyers
Unionist Party members of the United States House of Representatives from Virginia
Know-Nothing members of the United States House of Representatives from Virginia
19th-century American politicians
Lawyers from Clarksburg, West Virginia
United States senators who owned slaves